Bierwurst is a German cooked, smoked Brühwurst sausage originally from Bavaria, with a garlicky flavor and dark red color. It is seasoned with black peppercorns, paprika and mustard seeds for flavor.

The meat is partially cured and then made into the sausage with the other ingredients, after which, the sausage is further cured, smoked and then blanched.

It is usually sold as sandwich meat. Unsmoked, fresh Bierwurst will last for two days in the refrigerator. Pre-cooked Bierwurst will last for 5 to 7 days.

Contrary to the name, Bierwurst ("beer wurst", literally "beer sausage") does not contain any beer, but rather, is eaten as a snack with beer.  Bierschinken is eaten in a similar way.

See also 

 List of sausages
 List of smoked foods

References 

German sausages
Smoked meat
Cooked sausages